Nakor Bueno Gómez (born 4 March 1978), known simply as Nakor, is a Spanish former footballer who played as a forward.

He spent most of his professional career with Lleida, having signed in 2000.

Football career
Born in Barcelona, Catalonia, Nakor played youth football with two local clubs. In 1997 he signed with giants FC Barcelona, but only appeared for their C and B-teams.

Nakor would establish his professional career at neighbouring UE Lleida, where he spent six years. He totalled 200 competitive matches during his spell at the Camp d'Esports, the first and the last seasons being played in the second division.

After the team's relegation in 2006, Nakor stayed in the second level by joining CD Castellón. In the summer of 2008 he returned to division three, with Polideportivo Ejido; he continued to play in the latter tier in the following campaigns, with CD Leganés and UE Sant Andreu.

Personal life
Nakor's younger brother, Aarón, was also a footballer. A winger, he spent most of his career in the lower leagues.

References

External links

1978 births
Living people
Footballers from Barcelona
Spanish footballers
Association football forwards
Segunda División players
Segunda División B players
Tercera División players
FC Barcelona C players
FC Barcelona Atlètic players
UE Lleida players
CD Castellón footballers
Polideportivo Ejido footballers
CD Leganés players
UE Sant Andreu footballers
FC Ordino players
Spanish expatriate footballers
Expatriate footballers in Andorra